Bene Vagienna is a comune (municipality) in the Province of Cuneo in the Italian region Piedmont, located about  south of Turin and about  northeast of Cuneo.

Bene Vagienna borders the following municipalities: Carrù, Fossano, Lequio Tanaro, Magliano Alpi, Narzole, Piozzo, Salmour, and Trinità.

History 
The ancient town known to the Romans as Augusta Bagiennorum, believed to have been the capital of the Ligurian tribe of the Bagienni, was located in the frazione Roncaglia.

External links 
 www.benevagienna.it/